The Federal Building, formerly the U.S. Post Office, Courthouse and Federal Building, is located in Downtown Sacramento, California.

History
The Federal Building was designed by the local firm Starks and Flanders, who also designed the Elks Tower, the Alhambra Theatre, and the C. K. McClatchy High School. It reflects several early 20th Century Revival architectural styles, including Neoclassical, and especially a simplified Renaissance Revival style from the original French Renaissance architecture era.  Construction was completed in 1933. The legacy firm of Starks and Flanders is Nacht & Lewis Architects which is still operating in Sacramento.

Uses

The building has served historically as a courthouse, a post office, and a government office building.

It previously served the United States District Court for the Northern District of California until the United States District Court for the Eastern District of California was created in 1966.

The post office moved its operations to the Westfield Downtown Plaza on July 31, 2012.

Landmark
The 'Federal Building' was listed on the National Register of Historic Places in 1980.

See also 

List of United States federal courthouses in California
History of Sacramento, California
National Register of Historic Places listings in Sacramento County, California
California Historical Landmarks in Sacramento County, California
Nacht & Lewis Architects 
List of United States post offices

References

External links 

Sacramento Federal Building at the General Services Administration website
Nacht & Lewis History Project  

Federal buildings in the United States
Courthouses in California
Post office buildings in California
Buildings and structures in Sacramento, California
History of Sacramento, California
Government buildings completed in 1933
Courthouses on the National Register of Historic Places in California
Government buildings on the National Register of Historic Places in California
Post office buildings on the National Register of Historic Places in California
National Register of Historic Places in Sacramento, California
Former federal courthouses in the United States
1933 establishments in California
Neoclassical architecture in California
Renaissance Revival architecture in California